Neonematherium is an extinct genus of scelidotheriid ground sloths that lived in Argentina, Chile, and Colombia during the Early to Late Miocene. Fossils have been found in the Honda Group of Colombia, and the Río Frías Formation of Chile.

Taxonomy 
Neonematherium is a member of the Scelidotheriidae, a family of ground sloths known from the Oligocene, Miocene Pliocene, Pleistocene, and the Early Holocene epochs and are characterized by an elongated snout. Scelidotheres themselves part are usually placed as a subfamily of the Mylodontidae, although they are sometimes considered a separate family, Scelidotheriidae.

Below is a phylogenetic tree of the Scelidotheriidae, based on the work of Nieto et al. 2021, showing the position of Neonematherium.

References 

Prehistoric sloths
Prehistoric placental genera
Burdigalian first appearances
Langhian extinctions
Miocene xenarthrans
Miocene mammals of South America
Friasian
Colloncuran
Laventan
Mayoan
Chasicoan
Neogene Argentina
Fossils of Argentina
Neogene Chile
Fossils of Chile
Neogene Colombia
Fossils of Colombia
Honda Group, Colombia
Fossil taxa described in 1904
Taxa named by Florentino Ameghino